An RNA virus is a virusother than a retrovirusthat has ribonucleic acid (RNA) as its genetic material. The nucleic acid is usually single-stranded RNA (ssRNA) but it  may be double-stranded (dsRNA). Notable human diseases caused by RNA viruses include the common cold, influenza, SARS, MERS, Covid-19, Dengue Virus, hepatitis C, hepatitis E, West Nile fever, Ebola virus disease, rabies, polio, mumps, and measles.

The International Committee on Taxonomy of Viruses (ICTV) classifies RNA viruses as those that belong to Group III, Group IV or Group V of the Baltimore classification system. This category excludes Group VI, viruses with RNA genetic material but which use DNA intermediates in their life cycle: these are called retroviruses, including HIV-1 and HIV-2 which cause AIDS.

As of May 2020, all known RNA viruses encoding an RNA-directed RNA polymerase are believed to form a monophyletic group, known as the realm Riboviria. The majority of such RNA viruses fall into the kingdom Orthornavirae and the rest have a positioning not yet defined. The realm does not contain all RNA viruses: Deltavirus, Asunviroidae, and Pospiviroidae are taxa of RNA viruses that were mistakenly included in 2019, but corrected in 2020.

Characteristics

Single-stranded RNA viruses and RNA Sense
RNA viruses can be further classified according to the sense or polarity of their RNA into negative-sense and positive-sense, or ambisense RNA viruses. Positive-sense viral RNA is similar to mRNA and thus can be immediately translated by the host cell. Negative-sense viral RNA is complementary to mRNA and thus must be converted to positive-sense RNA by an RNA-dependent RNA polymerase before translation. Purified RNA of a positive-sense virus can directly cause infection though it may be less infectious than the whole virus particle. In contrast, purified RNA of a negative-sense virus is not infectious by itself as it needs to be transcribed into positive-sense RNA; each virion can be transcribed to several positive-sense RNAs. Ambisense RNA viruses resemble negative-sense RNA viruses, except they translate genes from their negative and positive strands.

Double-stranded RNA viruses

The double-stranded (ds)RNA viruses represent a diverse group of viruses that vary widely in host range (humans, animals, plants, fungi, and bacteria), genome segment number (one to twelve), and virion organization (Triangulation number, capsid layers, spikes, turrets, etc.). Members of this group include the rotaviruses, which are the most common cause of gastroenteritis in young children, and picobirnaviruses, which are the most common virus in fecal samples of both humans and animals with or without signs of diarrhea. Bluetongue virus is an economically important pathogen that infects cattle and sheep. In recent years, progress has been made in determining atomic and subnanometer resolution structures of a number of key viral proteins and virion capsids of several dsRNA viruses, highlighting the significant parallels in the structure and replicative processes of many of these viruses.

Mutation rates
RNA viruses generally have very high mutation rates compared to DNA viruses, because viral RNA polymerases lack the proofreading ability of DNA polymerases. The genetic diversity of RNA viruses is one reason why it is difficult to make effective vaccines against them. Retroviruses also have a high mutation rate even though their DNA intermediate integrates into the host genome (and is thus subject to host DNA proofreading once integrated), because errors during reverse transcription are embedded into both strands of DNA before integration. Some genes of RNA virus are important to the viral replication cycles and mutations are not tolerated. For example, the region of the hepatitis C virus genome that encodes the core protein is highly conserved, because it contains an RNA structure involved in an internal ribosome entry site.

Sequence complexity
On average, dsRNA viruses show a lower sequence redundancy relative to ssRNA viruses. Contrarily, dsDNA viruses contain the most redundant genome sequences while ssDNA viruses have the least. The sequence complexity of viruses has been shown to be a key characteristic for accurate reference-free viral classification.

Replication
Animal RNA viruses are classified by the ICTV. There are three distinct groups of RNA viruses depending on their genome and mode of replication:
 Double-stranded RNA viruses (Group III) contain from one to a dozen different RNA molecules, each coding for one or more viral proteins.
 Positive-sense ssRNA viruses (Group IV) have their genome directly utilized as mRNA, with host ribosomes translating it into a single protein that is modified by host and viral proteins to form the various proteins needed for replication. One of these includes RNA-dependent RNA polymerase (RNA replicase), which copies the viral RNA to form a double-stranded replicative form.  In turn, this dsRNA directs the formation of new viral RNA.
 Negative-sense ssRNA viruses (Group V) must have their genome copied by an RNA replicase to form positive-sense RNA. This means that the virus must bring along with it the enzyme RNA replicase. The positive-sense RNA molecule then acts as viral mRNA, which is translated into proteins by the host ribosomes.

Retroviruses (Group VI) have a single-stranded RNA genome but, in general, are not considered RNA viruses because they use DNA intermediates to replicate. Reverse transcriptase, a viral enzyme that comes from the virus itself after it is uncoated, converts the viral RNA into a complementary strand of DNA, which is copied to produce a double-stranded molecule of viral DNA. After this DNA is integrated into the host genome using the viral enzyme integrase, expression of the encoded genes may lead to the formation of new virions.

Recombination

Numerous RNA viruses are capable of genetic recombination when at least two viral genomes are present in the same host cell. Very rarely viral RNA can recombine with host RNA. RNA recombination appears to be a major driving force in determining genome architecture and the course of viral evolution among Picornaviridae ((+)ssRNA), e.g. poliovirus. In the Retroviridae ((+)ssRNA), e.g. HIV, damage in the RNA genome appears to be avoided during reverse transcription by strand switching, a form of recombination. Recombination also occurs in the Reoviridae (dsRNA), e.g. reovirus; Orthomyxoviridae ((-)ssRNA), e.g. influenza virus; and Coronaviridae ((+)ssRNA), e.g. SARS. Recombination in RNA viruses appears to be an adaptation for coping with genome damage. Recombination can occur infrequently between animal viruses of the same species but of divergent lineages. The resulting recombinant viruses may sometimes cause an outbreak of infection in humans.

Classification

Classification is based principally on the type of genome (double-stranded, negative- or positive-single-strand) and gene number and organization. Currently, there are 5 orders and 47 families of RNA viruses recognized. There are also many unassigned species and genera.

Related to but distinct from the RNA viruses are the viroids and the RNA satellite viruses. These are not currently classified as RNA viruses and are described on their own pages.

A study of several thousand RNA viruses has shown the presence of at least five main taxa: a levivirus and relatives group; a picornavirus supergroup; an alphavirus supergroup plus a flavivirus supergroup; the dsRNA viruses; and the -ve strand viruses. The lentivirus group appears to be basal to all the remaining RNA viruses. The next major division lies between the picornasupragroup and the remaining viruses. The dsRNA viruses appear to have evolved from a +ve RNA ancestor and the -ve RNA viruses from within the dsRNA viruses. The closest relation to the -ve stranded RNA viruses is the Reoviridae.

Positive strand RNA viruses

This is the single largest group of RNA viruses with 30 families. Attempts have been made to group these families in higher orders. These proposals were based on an analysis of the RNA polymerases and are still under consideration. To date, the suggestions proposed have not been broadly accepted because of doubts over the suitability of a single gene to determine the taxonomy of the clade.

The proposed classification of positive-strand RNA viruses is based on the RNA-dependent RNA polymerase. Three groups have been recognised:

 Bymoviruses, comoviruses, nepoviruses, nodaviruses, picornaviruses, potyviruses, sobemoviruses and a subset of luteoviruses (beet western yellows virus and potato leafroll virus)—the picorna like group (Picornavirata).
 Carmoviruses, dianthoviruses, flaviviruses, pestiviruses, statoviruses, tombusviruses, single-stranded RNA bacteriophages, hepatitis C virus and a subset of luteoviruses (barley yellow dwarf virus)—the flavi like group (Flavivirata).
 Alphaviruses, carlaviruses, furoviruses, hordeiviruses, potexviruses, rubiviruses, tobraviruses, tricornaviruses, tymoviruses, apple chlorotic leaf spot virus, beet yellows virus and hepatitis E virus—the alpha like group (Rubivirata).

A division of the alpha-like (Sindbis-like) supergroup on the basis of a novel domain located near the N termini of the proteins involved in viral replication has been proposed. The two groups proposed are: the 'altovirus' group (alphaviruses, furoviruses, hepatitis E virus, hordeiviruses, tobamoviruses, tobraviruses, tricornaviruses and probably rubiviruses); and the 'typovirus' group (apple chlorotic leaf spot virus, carlaviruses, potexviruses and tymoviruses).

The alpha like supergroup can be further divided into three clades: the rubi-like, tobamo-like, and tymo-like viruses.

Additional work has identified five groups of positive-stranded RNA viruses containing four, three, three, three, and one order(s), respectively. These fourteen orders contain 31 virus families (including 17 families of plant viruses) and 48 genera (including 30 genera of plant viruses). This analysis suggests that alphaviruses and flaviviruses can be separated into two families—the Togaviridae and Flaviridae, respectively—but suggests that other taxonomic assignments, such as the pestiviruses, hepatitis C virus, rubiviruses, hepatitis E virus, and arteriviruses, may be incorrect. The coronaviruses and toroviruses appear to be distinct families in distinct orders and not distinct genera of the same family as currently classified. The luteoviruses appear to be two families rather than one, and apple chlorotic leaf spot virus appears not to be a closterovirus but a new genus of the Potexviridae.

Evolution 

The evolution of the picornaviruses based on an analysis of their RNA polymerases and helicases appears to date to the divergence of eukaryotes. Their putative ancestors include the bacterial group II retroelements, the family of HtrA proteases and DNA bacteriophages.

Partitiviruses are related to and may have evolved from a totivirus ancestor.

Hypoviruses and barnaviruses appear to share an ancestry with the potyvirus and sobemovirus lineages respectively.

Double-stranded RNA viruses

This analysis also suggests that the dsRNA viruses are not closely related to each other but instead belong to four additional classes—Birnaviridae, Cystoviridae, Partitiviridae, and Reoviridae—and one additional order (Totiviridae) of one of the classes of positive ssRNA viruses in the same subphylum as the positive-strand RNA viruses.

One study has suggested that there are two large clades: One includes the families Caliciviridae, Flaviviridae, and Picornaviridae and a second that includes the families Alphatetraviridae, Birnaviridae, Cystoviridae, Nodaviridae, and Permutotretraviridae.

Negative strand RNA viruses

These viruses have multiple types of genome ranging from a single RNA molecule up to eight segments. Despite their diversity it appears that they may have originated in arthropods and to have diversified from there.

Satellite viruses

A number of satellite viruses—viruses that require the assistance of another virus to complete their life cycle—are also known. Their taxonomy has yet to be settled. The following four genera have been proposed for positive sense single stranded RNA satellite viruses that infect plants—Albetovirus, Aumaivirus, Papanivirus and Virtovirus. A family—Sarthroviridae which includes the genus Macronovirus—has been proposed for the positive sense single stranded RNA satellite viruses that infect arthropods.

Group III – dsRNA viruses

There are twelve families and a number of unassigned genera and species recognised in this group.
 Family Amalgaviridae
 Family Birnaviridae
 Family Chrysoviridae
 Family Cystoviridae
 Family Endornaviridae
 Family Hypoviridae
 Family Megabirnaviridae
 Family Partitiviridae
 Family Picobirnaviridae
 Family Reoviridae – includes Rotavirus
 Family Totiviridae
 Family Quadriviridae
 Genus Botybirnavirus
 Unassigned species
 Botrytis porri RNA virus 1
 Circulifer tenellus virus 1
 Colletotrichum camelliae filamentous virus 1
 Cucurbit yellows associated virus
 Sclerotinia sclerotiorum debilitation-associated virus
 Spissistilus festinus virus 1

Group IV – positive-sense ssRNA viruses

There are three orders and 34 families recognised in this group. In addition, there are a number of unclassified species and genera.
 Order Nidovirales
 Family Arteriviridae
 Family Coronaviridae – includes Human coronavirus (common cold viruses HCoV-229E, HCoV-HKU1, HCoV-NL63, and HCoV-OC43), MERS-CoV, SARS-CoV-1 and SARS-CoV-2
 Family Mesoniviridae
 Family Roniviridae
 Order Picornavirales
 Family Dicistroviridae
 Family Iflaviridae
 Family Marnaviridae
 Family Picornaviridae – includes Poliovirus, Rhinovirus (a common cold virus), Hepatitis A virus
 Family Secoviridae includes subfamily Comovirinae
 Genus Bacillariornavirus
 Species Kelp fly virus
 Order Tymovirales
 Family Alphaflexiviridae
 Family Betaflexiviridae
 Family Gammaflexiviridae
 Family Tymoviridae
 Unassigned
 Family Alphatetraviridae
 Family Alvernaviridae
 Family Astroviridae
 Family Barnaviridae
 Family Benyviridae
 Family Botourmiaviridae
 Family Bromoviridae
 Family Caliciviridae – includes Norwalk virus
 Family Carmotetraviridae
 Family Closteroviridae
 Family Flaviviridae – includes Yellow fever virus, West Nile virus, Hepatitis C virus, Dengue fever virus, Zika virus
 Family Fusariviridae
 Family Hepeviridae
 Family Hypoviridae
 Family Leviviridae
 Family Luteoviridae – includes Barley yellow dwarf virus
 Family Polycipiviridae
 Family Narnaviridae
 Family Nodaviridae
 Family Permutotetraviridae
 Family Potyviridae
 Family Sarthroviridae
 Family Statovirus
 Family Togaviridae – includes Rubella virus, Ross River virus, Sindbis virus, Chikungunya virus
 Family Tombusviridae
 Family Virgaviridae
 Unassigned genera
 Genus Blunervirus
 Genus Cilevirus
 Genus Higrevirus
 Genus Idaeovirus
 Genus Negevirus
 Genus Ourmiavirus
 Genus Polemovirus
 Genus Sinaivirus
 Genus Sobemovirus
 Unassigned species
 Acyrthosiphon pisum virus
 Bastrovirus
 Blackford virus
 Blueberry necrotic ring blotch virus
 Cadicistrovirus
 Chara australis virus
 Extra small virus
 Goji berry chlorosis virus
 Harmonia axyridis virus 1
 Hepelivirus
 Jingmen tick virus
 Le Blanc virus
 Nedicistrovirus
 Nesidiocoris tenuis virus 1
 Niflavirus
 Nylanderia fulva virus 1
 Orsay virus
 Osedax japonicus RNA virus 1
 Picalivirus
 Planarian secretory cell nidovirus
 Plasmopara halstedii virus
 Rosellinia necatrix fusarivirus 1
 Santeuil virus
 Secalivirus
 Solenopsis invicta virus 3
 Wuhan large pig roundworm virus

Satellite viruses
 Family Sarthroviridae
 Genus Albetovirus
 Genus Aumaivirus
 Genus Papanivirus
 Genus Virtovirus
 Chronic bee paralysis virus

An unclassified astrovirus/hepevirus-like virus has also been described.

Group V – negative-sense ssRNA viruses

With the exception of the Hepatitis D virus, this group of viruses has been placed into a single phylum—Negarnaviricota. This phylum has been divided into two subphyla—Haploviricotina and Polyploviricotina. Within the subphylum Haploviricotina four classes are currently recognised: Chunqiuviricetes, Milneviricetes, Monjiviricetes and Yunchangviricetes. In the subphylum Polyploviricotina two classes are recognised: Ellioviricetes and Insthoviricetes.

Six classes, seven orders and twenty four families are currently recognized in this group. A number of unassigned species and genera are yet to be classified.
 Phylum Negarnaviricota
 Subphylum Haploviricotina
 Class Chunqiuviricetes
 Order Muvirales
 Family Qinviridae
 Class Milneviricetes
 Order Serpentovirales
 Family Aspiviridae
 Class Monjiviricetes
 Order Jingchuvirales
 Family Chuviridae
 Order Mononegavirales
 Family Bornaviridae – Borna disease virus
 Family Filoviridae – includes Ebola virus, Marburg virus
 Family Mymonaviridae
 Family Nyamiviridae
 Family Paramyxoviridae – includes Measles virus, Mumps virus, Nipah virus, Hendra virus, and NDV
 Family Pneumoviridae – includes RSV and Metapneumovirus
 Family Rhabdoviridae – includes Rabies virus
 Family Sunviridae
 Genus Anphevirus
 Genus Arlivirus
 Genus Chengtivirus
 Genus Crustavirus
 Genus Wastrivirus
 Class Yunchangviricetes
 Order Goujianvirales
 Family Yueviridae
 Subphylum Polyploviricotina
 Class Ellioviricetes
 Order Bunyavirales
 Family Arenaviridae – includes Lassa virus
 Family Cruliviridae
 Family Feraviridae
 Family Fimoviridae
 Family Hantaviridae
 Family Jonviridae
 Family Nairoviridae
 Family Peribunyaviridae
 Family Phasmaviridae
 Family Phenuiviridae
 Family Tospoviridae
 Genus Tilapineviridae
 Class Insthoviricetes
 Order Articulavirales
 Family Amnoonviridae – includes Taastrup virus
 Family Orthomyxoviridae – includes Influenza viruses
 Unassigned genera:
 Genus Deltavirus – includes Hepatitis D virus (not a true virus, but a subviral agent)

Gallery

See also 

 Virus classification
 List of viruses
 Viral replication
 Positive/negative-sense
 Animal viruses
 Double-stranded RNA viruses
 Retrovirus
 DNA viruses
 Norovirus cis-acting replication element
 Viroid

Notes

References

External links 
 
 Animal viruses

 
RNA